The New York City Office of Collective Bargaining (OCB) is an agency of the New York City government that regulates labor relations disputes and controversies with city employees, including certification of collective bargaining representatives, mediation, impasse panels, and arbitration. It is similar to the state Public Employment Relations Board (PERB).

References

External links
 
 Office of Collective Bargaining in the Rules of the City of New York

Collective Bargaining